NYPD Red 4 is the fourth novel in the James Patterson NYPD Red series.

Plot
This fourth novel in the NYPD Red series centers on two of the NYPD Red detectives, Zach Jordan and his partner Kylie MacDonald. NYPD Red, an entity invented by Patterson for his series, is an elite and well trained unit that has the job of protecting the rich, the famous and the well connected. This novel has three distinct plots. The main plot involves the robbery of an $8 million necklace that involved a murder of a starlet that was witnessed by a large crowd of people. A second plot involves the theft of expensive diagnostic equipment from a number of the city's hospitals. The subplot is the search for Kylie's husband, who has relapsed after going through several drug abuse rehab programs.

Reviews
This book was at the top of the USA Today best seller list in early February 2016.

References

2016 American novels
Novels by James Patterson
Little, Brown and Company books